Akhri Barish is a Pakistani drama which aired from 3 April 2011 to 11 December 2011 on Hum TV. Previously, the drama went by the name Larki chaya; however, it was later changed to Akhri Barish, possibly to avoid people thinking it is a drama about prostitution.

The story revolves around the weaknesses in our social norms and behaviour. It highlights the dilemma of a woman who has left her past behind, but still faces hurdles in being accepted as a member of the society.

Cast
 Arjumand Rahim
 Angeline Malik as Zeenut Aman
 Samina Ahmad
 Moammar Rana
 Sajid Hasan
 Rehan Sheikh
 Rubina Ashraf
 Maria Wasti
 Mariya Khan
 Faisal Qureshi
 Mehwish Hayat
 Sami Khan
 Shakeel
 Adna Jilani
 Mehak Ali
 Afshan Qureshi
 Maria Khan
 Galeo
 Milli
 Shan
 Barkatullah
 Fozia Mustaq
 Rehana Kaleem
 Samina
 Aslam Sheikh
 Saif Ullah
 Arif Dawood
 Hanif Bachan
 Shireen Maqsood
 Urooj Abbasi

References

2011 Pakistani television series debuts
Pakistani drama television series
Urdu-language television shows
Hum TV original programming
Pakistani television series endings